The Minié rifle was an important infantry rifle of the mid-19th century.  A version was adopted in 1849 following the invention of the Minié ball  in 1847 by the French Army captain Claude-Étienne Minié of the Chasseurs d'Orléans and Henri-Gustave Delvigne. The bullet was designed to allow rapid muzzle loading of rifles, and was an innovation that brought about the widespread use of the rifle as the main battlefield weapon for individual soldiers.  The French adopted it following difficulties encountered by the French army in North Africa, where their muskets were outranged by long-barreled weapons which were handcrafted by their Algerian opponents. The Minié rifle belonged to the category of rifled muskets.

Mechanism
The rifle used a conical-cylindrical shaped soft lead bullet, slightly smaller than the barrel bore, with three exterior grease-filled peripheral grooves and a conical hollow in its base. When fired, the expanding gas forcibly pushed on the skirted base of the bullet, spreading it to engage the rifling. This provided spin for accuracy, a better seal for consistent velocity and longer range, and cleaning of barrel detritus.

Before this innovation, the smoothbore musket commonly using the buck and ball was the only practical field weapon. Rifled muskets had been in use since the Renaissance, but they required hammering projectiles with a ramrod and mallet into the bore of the barrel, and also created considerable cleaning problems. The short-lived "carabine à tige" system used a pin at the bottom of the barrel which deformed the bullet against the wall of the barrel when the bullet was pushed to the bottom. This system was very problematic for cleaning, especially with the black powders of the period.

A test in Vincennes in 1849 demonstrated that at 15 yards the bullet was able to penetrate two boards of poplar wood, each two-thirds of an inch thick and separated by 20 inches. Soldiers of the time spread rumors that at 1,200 yards the bullet could penetrate a soldier and his knapsack and still kill anyone standing behind him, even killing every person in a line of 15.

The Minié rifle saw limited distribution in the Crimean War and similar rifles using Minié bullets (such as the Pattern 1853 Enfield, the Springfield Model 1861 and the Lorenz rifle) were the dominant infantry weapons in the American Civil War. The large-caliber, easily deformed conical lead bullets, ranging in diameter from .54 to .58 inches (14-18mm), combined with the high-speed spin from the rifling, created terrible wounds.

Use
The Pattern 1851 Minié rifle was in use by the British Army from 1851 to 1855. The Minié system was also used extensively by various manufacturers, such as Springfield (the Springfield Model 1861) and Enfield (the Pattern 1853 Enfield).

Minié rifles were also used extensively in the Boshin War (1868–1869) in Japan, where they had an important role in tipping the balance against the Tokugawa forces in encounters such as the Battle of Toba–Fushimi.

Obsolescence
In the Second Schleswig War, the muzzle-loading Minié rifle became obsolete in 1864 as the Danish foundered, equipped with Minié rifles, against the Prussians, who had the innovative early bolt-action Dreyse rifles. Later, in the Austro-Prussian War, the Prussians again defeated their enemy in the form of the Austrians who were also equipped with Minié rifles. In France, the existing Minié rifles were then retooled to accommodate a breech-loading mechanism reminiscent of a snuff box, and became known as Tabatière (snuff-box) rifles. Soon after, the breech-loading Chassepot system was adopted by the French army.

Gallery

See also
French weapons in the American Civil War

References

 Nosworthy, Brent, The Bloody Crucible of Courage, Fighting Methods and Combat Experience of the Civil War, Carroll and Graf Publishers, 2003, .
 Smithsonian article

Rifled muskets
Rifles of France
Early rifles
American Civil War rifles